Platystoma is a genus of flies (Diptera) belonging to the family Platystomatidae.

Description
Platystoma species are small flies reaching a length of 4–10 millimeters. The body is black speckled with small whitish or yellowish markings, while the eyes are usually red. They have a quite broad proboscis (hence the Latin name Platystoma, meaning "broad mouth"). The wings are blackish with clear speckles. These flies show a complex mating ritual.

Distribution
Species belonging to this genus are present in most of Europe, in the eastern Palearctic realm, in the Near East and in North Africa.

Taxonomy
The genus is in need of revision to clarify the position of many subspecies that are currently listed. Most of these subspecies were designated by Hennig, but some have been raised to full species since. The list below incorporates those names more recently upgraded to species, but leaves the remainder of the subspecies designated by Hennig as subspecies until their position can be rectified by revision.

Species
P. aenescens Loew, 1868
P. afghanistanicum Soós, 1977
P. altaicum Soós, 1978
P. arcuatum Loew, 1856
P. bezzii Hendel, 1913
P. bipilosum Portschinsky, 1875 c g
P. canum Portschinsky, 1875 c g
P. centralasiaticum Soós, 1978
P. chrysotoxum Hendel, 1913
P. clathratum Hendel, 1913
P. corticarum (Rondani, 1869)
P. curvinerve Hendel, 1913
P. dimidiatum Hendel, 1913
P. elegans Hendel, 1913
P. euphorbiinum Enderlein, 1930
P. gemmationis (Rondani, 1869)
P. gemmationis bifasciatum Brulle, 1832 c g
P. gilvipes Loew, 1868
P. hendeli Lindner, 1941
P. ilguenense Bischof, 1905 c g
P. insularum (Rondani, 1869)
P. kaszabi Soós, 1978
P. lativentre Loew, 1866
P. lugubre (Robineau-Desvoidy, 1830)
P. lugubre corsicarum (Séguy, 1932)
P. lugubre pleuronitens Hendel, 1913
P. malatiense Hennig, 1945
P. mandschuricum Enderlein, 1937
P. mendex Soós, 1978
P. meridionale Hendel, 1913
P. meridionale idia Séguy, 1934
P. mongolicum Soós, 1978
P. murinum Hendel, 1913
P. nitidiventre Hendel, 1913
P. obtusum Hendel, 1913
P. oculatum Becker, 1907
P. oculatum pavonis Hendel, 1913
P. plantationis (Rondani, 1869)
P. provinciale Loew, 1868
P. pubescens Loew, 1845
P. punctiventre Portschinsky, 1875
P. rufipes Meigen, 1826
P. seminationis (Fabricius, 1775)
P. seminationis angustipennis Loew, 1854
P. seminationis biseta Loew, 1868
P. seminationis frauenfeldi (Nowicki, 1867)
P. seminationis rufimana Loew, 1873
P. seminationis valachiae Hendel, 1913
P. soosi Krivosheina & Krivosheina, 1996
P. stackelbergi Soós, 1979
P. strix Portschinsky, 1875
P. suave Loew, 1873
P. subfasciatum Loew, 1862
P. subtile Loew, 1868
P. tegularum Loew, 1859
P. ussuricum Korneyev, 1991

References

External links 
 Biolib
 Fauna Europaea
 Arthropods.de

Diptera of Africa
Muscomorph flies of Europe
Platystomatidae
Tephritoidea genera
Taxa named by Johann Wilhelm Meigen